Ute Remus (born 1941) is a German actress, radio reader, presenter, and editor, as well as  a writer.

Books
2004: Sollst je du sollst du Schwänin auf dem Ozean. Hommage an Lou Straus-Ernst ("Should you ever be, should you be a swan on the ocean. A trubute to Luise Straus-Ernst"), 
2013: Bloß nicht auf Sand bauen, autobiographical novel
2014: Mit dem Buch im Gepäck

Awards
1976: Kurt Magnus Prize for young broadcasters
1989: Civis Media Prize for special program "Alltagskonflikte - Mit so einem gehst Du? Deutsch-türkische Liebe"

Notes

References

External links

Ute Remus, a  Cologne Women's History Association wiki article

1941 births
Living people
German actresses
German writers
German radio presenters
Westdeutscher Rundfunk people